Washington Corrections Center is a Washington State Department of Corrections men's prison located in Shelton, Washington. With an operating capacity of 1,300, it is the sixth largest prison in the state (after Stafford Creek Corrections Center) and is surrounded by forestland. It opened  in 1964, seventy-five years after statehood.

Washington Corrections Center is located at 2321 W Dayton Airport Rd

Facilities and Programs
Washington Corrections Center facilitates Educational and Offender Change programs, Work and Vocational programs, and Sustainability programs.
Educational and Offender Change programs include: GED programs, Computer basics programs, and a prison library. they're intent is to teach incarcerated new skills, and help them to transition into the outside world.
Work and Vocational programs include: groundskeeping and vehicle maintenance, these are how prisoners earn prison salaries or commissary.
Sustainability programs include: Composting, and Vegetable Gardens. They're intent is to allow prisoners to practice skills learned in prison, and make the prison self-sustaining.

Organization
Washington Corrections Center is located on a 400-acre campus in Shelton, Washington. On campus, there is 9 housing units by the names of:
Cedar
Evergreen
R-1
R-2
R-3
R-4
R-5
R-6
IMU
These vary from minimum to maximum security.

History
Washington Corrections Center was opened  in 1964, making it the 5th oldest prison in Washington state. All prisoners entering the Washington State Prison System must pass through Washington Corrections Center in order to be permanently assigned to another prison. In 2014, two prisoners at Washington Corrections Center committed successful suicides, leading the Washington State Department of Corrections to reform their official policy on suicides. In September, 2015 Washington Corrections Center became the second prison (after Snake River Correctional Institution in Oregon) to install a "Blueroom" inside of solitary confinement to play nature videos for prisoners.

See also
List of law enforcement agencies in Washington (state)
List of United States state correction agencies
List of U.S. state prisons
List of Washington state prisons

References

Prisons in Washington (state)
Shelton, Washington
1964 establishments in Washington (state)
Buildings and structures in Mason County, Washington